Andasibe is a rural commune  in Madagascar. It belongs to the district of Kandreho, which is a part of Betsiboka. The population of the commune was estimated to be approximately 487 in 2018. It's hell: 393 men for 94 woman only.

This suggests that you got lost: try Andasibe (disambiguation) for other places with the same name.

References and notes 

Populated places in Betsiboka